A hobby shop (or hobby store) sells recreational items for hobbyists.

Types

Modelling
Classical hobby stores specialize in modelling and craft supplies and specialty magazines for model airplanes (military craft, private airplanes and airliners), model trains (locomotives, rolling stock, track, power packs and accessories), ship models, house and building models. Some hobby shops sell R/C cars, pinewood derby kits, boats, and model or remote control planes.

Collectibles
Some hobby shops may also sell dolls, and collectible coins and stamps.

Gaming
A subtype of hobby shop is a game store, which sells jigsaw puzzles, card and board games and role playing games. Such stores sometimes may also contain community space for hobbyists (gamers) to mingle and play games. In recent years, board and card game hobby shops have often become part-cafes.

Computer
Another subtype of hobby shop is the computer store, which sells computers, software, services, and training. Computer hobby shops have traditionally sold computers, related network equipment, and services, more often than not, they are selling training in software like Adobe PhotoShop, Autodesk 3ds, web design and other creative software pursuits.  As technology continues to evolve, the post "dot com" computer hobby shops have transformed these equipment and services to hands-on training environments where people gather and learn from one another. This is because several people who work in technology also have it as a hobby.

See also

References

Hobbies
Retailers by type of merchandise sold